Guy Mezger (born January 1, 1968) is an American martial artist, who competed in professional combat sports including full contact karate, kickboxing, and boxing, but is most recognized as a mixed martial arts (MMA) fighter. Mezger retired from professional competition on January 25, 2005. He is associated with Lion's Den and runs their school in Dallas. Mezger was a champion in mixed martial arts in two different promotions, the UFC and Pancrase. He holds wins over Tito Ortiz, Masakatsu Funaki, Yuki Kondo, Semmy Schilt, and Minoru Suzuki.

Mezger has trained with many great martial arts competitors and trainer/instructors; his main trainers have been Vince Tamura (judo), Willie Thompson (wrestling), Billy "Jack" Jackson (kickboxing), and Ken Shamrock (shootfighting). Mezger has co-written a book, The Complete Idiot's Guide to Kickboxing; he had an uncredited speaking role in the first-season episode of Walker, Texas Ranger titled "Night of the Gladiator".

Early life 
Born in Houston and raised in Dallas, Mezger wrestled in high school and also practiced taekwondo, in which he holds a 7th degree black belt. As a professional kickboxer, he won the U.S. Heavyweight title before winning the WKC World Heavyweight Championship in June 1995; a title he defended once before retiring from the sport to compete in Pancrase.

Mixed martial arts career

Ultimate Fighting Championship and Pancrase 
Mezger began his mixed martial arts career in the Ultimate Fighting Championship at UFC 4 in an alternate match against Jason Fairn. Before the fight, Mezger had asked Fairn to make a 'gentlemen's agreement' not to pull hair due to the fact both men had long hair. Mezger won the bout by TKO after landing a multitude of strikes from full mount. Mezger next fought at UFC 5 in an alternate match against John Dowdy, defeating him by TKO in little over two minutes by mounted strikes. Mezger began to train with Ken Shamrock and became a member of Ken's submission fighting team, the Lion's Den, and joined the Pancrase organization in Japan.

In his second match at the Pancrase 1995 Anniversary Show, Mezger faced Pancrase co-founder and Shamrock's trainer Masakatsu Funaki. The American fighter performed well, scoring high kicks and forcing Funaki to pull guard and work from the bottom, but he was eventually caught in a leglock exchange from his own trip and submitted with an Achilles lock.

On December 1995, Mezger was involved in a controversial match against the other Pancrase co-founder, lauded wrestler Minoru Suzuki. Mezger controlled the match, but he landed an accidental kick to the groin at 7:15 in the first round and was disqualified by the referee. His corner protested and defended the accidental nature of the strike, but the result was not changed. Guy's personal record shows it as a no contest.

Nonetheless, Mezger accumulated a Pancrase 16–7–2 record and become the 7th ever King of Pancrase world champion with a win over Masakatsu Funaki.

Mezger would not return to the UFC until UFC 13 where he competed in the Lightweight Tournament (200 lbs & under). In his first bout, Mezger fought top ranked judo fighter, Christophe Leininger. Leininger was able to score a takedown and gain mount at one point, but he was otherwise soundly beaten as Mezger battled his way to a decision victory. Mezger broke his hand during this fight but continued in the tournament.

The championship round Mezger faced future UFC Light Heavyweight Champion Tito Ortiz. Ortiz was able to counter Mezger's takedown attempt and landed several knees to Mezger's head. To some it appeared that Mezger had tapped, but referee John McCarthy ruled Mezger was blocking the knees and his hand went down as Ortiz shifted his weight. The bout was then stopped to check Mezger's cut. The announcers, as well as Ortiz, thought that the bout was over, but the fight was instead restarted on the feet. Ortiz shot in for a takedown, but Mezger secured a guillotine choke, forcing Ortiz to submit. With this win, Mezger became the UFC 13 lightweight tournament champion.

Mezger then forfeited his King of Pancrase title to fight in the UFC again. Mezger's final bout in the UFC was a rematch with Tito Ortiz at UFC 19: Young Guns. Mezger was sick before the fight but fought anyway, a decision that he regretted after the fight. This resulted in Ortiz handling Mezger and won the bout at the 9:55 mark by referee stoppage. The stoppage was somewhat controversial because both Mezger and his cornerman Ken Shamrock felt that Ortiz's strikes were not doing enough damage to warrant a stoppage. Ortiz then donned a shirt that was insulting to Mezger which provoked an immediate reaction from Ken Shamrock, Mezger's trainer. Mezger would occasionally seek a rematch with Ortiz over the next few years. In 2004 he was finally granted a chance to face Tito Ortiz at UFC 50. Unfortunately, the week of the fight, Mezger was taken to the hospital due to stroke like symptoms, and was taken off the fight card.

PRIDE Fighting championships 
The former UFC champion made his Pride FC debut in 1999 at Pride 6 against the popular Akira Shoji. The two fighters passed most of the first round in the clinch, where Mezger landed strikes and tried unsuccessfully to take down Shoji. At the second, Akira scored a takedown and performed ground and pound, which Mezger retaliated by controlling the striking again when they returned to their feet; however, the Japanese took Mezger's back on the ground towards the end of the round and scored punches while Guy attempted to escape. At the third and final round, the two traded strikes again and Shoji repeated his back siege before the fight ended. The judges decreed a split decision and it was given to Shoji.

Pride officials then signed Mezger to fight Kazushi Sakuraba, who at the time was considered to be one of the best pound for pound fighters in the world. The fight took place at the Pride Grand Prix 2000 Opening Round. Mezger took the fight on two weeks notice and had a broken foot going into the fight. The contract that Mezger signed stipulated that the fight would be one 15-minute round with no overtime, in contrast to the other fights which were to have an extra round in the case of a draw. The fight mostly consisted of Mezger controlling the fight by stopping Sakuraba's takedown attempts while landing strikes from the outside. The round ended and Mezger expected the fight to go to the judges, but Pride officials wanted the fight to go to overtime. This resulted in one of the largest and most publicized controversies in MMA history.

According to Mezger, Pride did not like the outcome of the fight and changed the agreement/contract on the spot in order to give Sakuraba another chance to win the fight. An argument ensued and Mezger was ordered out of the ring and back to the locker room by his corner man, Ken Shamrock, who was livid at the decision to extend the fight because of Mezger's foot injury and the fact that he took the fight on short notice. Later that night, the president of Pride FC made a public apology to Mezger at the Tokyo Dome for the miscommunication. Mezger added, "Royce's father came up to me after my fight and said, "You got screwed. You won that fight." Here's Helio Gracie walking up to me and telling me I got ripped off."

Mezger next competed against Masaaki Satake, winning the fight by unanimous decision.

Mezger made his return to the ring at Pride 10 - Return of the Warriors, facing Brazilian superstar and future middleweight kingpin Wanderlei Silva. Mezger gained the upper hand early, cutting Silva with several crisp combinations and outpointing Silva on the feet. However, he was ultimately knocked out at the 3:45 mark. Shortly before the knockout, Silva was catching the worse end of the punching exchanges and proceeded to throw an intentional, illegal headbutt to Mezger that eventually led to landing the knockout combination. Many people felt as though this was a cheap shot that affected the end result. Some people, including Kazushi Sakuraba, felt the bout should have been changed to a no contest. Mezger talked about his feelings on the matter in an interview: "I am not going to cry foul, it is the fight game and things like that happen, get used to it. It is no win situation when it comes to answering that question, if I said it did (affect the result) then I would be making excuses. I would just like a rematch."

Mezger found a measure of redemption when he defeated Alexander Otsuka by TKO at Pride 12 - Cold Fury. Otsuka challenged Mezger to another fight, but was soundly beaten by TKO for a second time. Mezger returned again at Pride 13 - Collision Course to face Egan Inoue. Mezger walked away with a knockout win over Inoue.

Mezger then met UFC Hall of Famer Chuck Liddell at Pride 14 - Clash of the Titans. Liddell was coming off of a stunning KO over former UFC Heavyweight Champion, Kevin Randleman. Mezger gained control of the first round, knocking Liddell to the mat with a strike and landing a left kick to Liddell's face a few minutes before the bell sounded ending the first round. The second round would be short-lived as Liddell came out strong, knocking Mezger out.

Mezger faced two time ADCC champion Ricardo Arona at Pride 16. Mezger entered the ring with an American flag draped across his shoulders out of respect for the World Trade Center attacks in New York. He also wore trunks with an American flag design. Arona and Mezger circled each other for a few moments, before moving in and exchanging strikes. Mezger ended the round one with two takedowns and side mount position but couldn't capitalize on it. The second round was much of the same until Mezger landed a stunning kick to Arona's face. The third round took a different turn with three minutes left in the round, Arona scored his only takedown of the fight. The third round continued like this, with Arona laying on Mezger, using his ground and pound style for the last three minutes of the bout. Although Mezger controlled the first two rounds (1st round being 10 minutes and the second and third rounds were 5 minutes each), the judges awarded a controversial split decision victory to Arona, causing many to feel that Mezger was robbed of the win.

In December 2001, Mezger was proposed the idea of fighting at Inoki Bom-Ba-Ye while wearing Tiger Mask's attire and mask, but he didn't accept. Thus, Mezger returned to competition at Pride 22 after a year long lay-off, easily winning a decision over Norihisa Yamamoto. Mezger then battled Antônio Rogério Nogueira at Pride 24. Mezger had several good striking exchanges and showcased his submission and takedown defense, but again lost the fight by a controversial split decision.

Retirement 
On January 25, 2005, Guy Mezger retired from professional fighting after experiencing stroke-like symptoms prior to his scheduled bout with Tito Ortiz. Mezger trains students in boxing, kickboxing and the Lion's Den Mixed Martial Arts system at his gym, Guy Mezger's Combat Sports Club, in Dallas. He also has a consulting company, CS Consulting, that works with both Federal and State law enforcement agencies on re-vamping their defensive tactics training. Mezger is a part owner in a movie/TV production company that is making "reality TV" shows and action and documentary movies. In 2011, he finished up his studies in holistic medicine (receiving his PhD in Holistic Health) and formed a partnership with a doctor's group called Optimal Health Specialists.

Mezger was the President of Mark Cuban's HDNet Fights and was responsible for developing new talent and securing promotion partners for HDnet's Friday Night Fights. He has also commentated for Chuck Norris' full contact, team-based martial arts competition, the World Combat League, and for Japanese MMA organization DREAM.

Personal life 
Mezger and his wife Michelle have two children, Logan and Rachel. He also has a son named Jake from a previous relationship.

In December 2011, Mezger was involved in an altercation in Dallas in front of a sporting goods store where a man was physically abusing a woman. He stepped in to assist the woman by fighting the man, who attacked Mezger with a knife. The attacker was on parole and afterwards needed medical attention for multiple facial bone and arm bone fractures. Mezger's hand was cut in the fight. It was surgically repaired and he was expected to fully recover.

Titles

Mixed martial arts 
Pancrase Hybrid Wrestling
 King of Pancrase Openweight Championship (3 Times)
 1996 Pancrase Ranking Tournament Champion
Ultimate Fighting Championship
 UFC 13 Lightweight Tournament Winner

Karate 
World Full Contact
 1993 & 1994 World Full-Contact Karate Champion

Kickboxing 
World Kickboxing Council
 1995 WKC World Kickboxing Champion
 Other
 1996 WFFF World Freestyle Fighting Champion (Junior-Heavyweight)

Mixed martial arts record 

|-
| Win
| align=center| 30–14–2
| Daniel Bergman
| TKO (punches)
| European Vale Tudo 1 – Genesis
| 
| align=center| 2
| align=center| 1:46
| Copenhagen, Denmark
| 
|-
| Loss
| align=center| 29–14–2
| Antônio Rogério Nogueira
| Decision (split)
| Pride 24 – Cold Fury 3
| 
| align=center| 3
| align=center| 5:00
| Fukuoka, Japan
| 
|-
| Win
| align=center| 29–13–2
| Yoshihisa Yamamoto
| Decision (unanimous)
| Pride 22 – Beasts From The East 2
| 
| align=center| 3
| align=center| 5:00
| Nagoya, Japan
| 
|-
| Loss
| align=center| 28–13–2
| Ricardo Arona
| Decision (split)
| Pride 16 – Beasts From The East
| 
| align=center| 3
| align=center| 5:00
| Osaka, Japan
| 
|-
| Loss
| align=center| 28–12–2
| Chuck Liddell
| KO (punch)
| Pride 14 - Clash of the Titans
| 
| align=center| 2
| align=center| 0:21
| Yokohama, Japan
| 
|-
| Win
| align=center| 28–11–2
| Egan Inoue
| KO (knee and punch)
| Pride 13 - Collision Course
| 
| align=center| 1
| align=center| 2:25
| Saitama, Japan
| 
|-
| Win
| align=center| 27–11–2
| Alexander Otsuka
| TKO (doctor stoppage)
| KOTC 7 - Wet and Wild
| 
| align=center| 2
| align=center| 1:57
| San Jacinto, California, United States
| 
|-
| Win
| align=center| 26–11–2
| Alexander Otsuka
| TKO (punches)
| Pride 12 - Cold Fury
| 
| align=center| 1
| align=center| 1:52
| Saitama, Japan
| 
|-
| Win
| align=center| 25–11–2
| Sam Adkins
| Submission
| Freestyle Fighting Championship
| 
| align=center| 1
| align=center| 2:11
| Dallas, Texas, United States
| 
|-
| Loss
| align=center| 24–11–2
| Wanderlei Silva
| KO (punches)
| Pride 10 - Return of the Warriors
| 
| align=center| 1
| align=center| 3:45
| Tokyo, Japan
| 
|-
| Win
| align=center| 24–10–2
| Masaaki Satake
| Decision (unanimous)
| Pride Grand Prix 2000 Finals
| 
| align=center| 1
| align=center| 15:00
| Tokyo, Japan
| 
|-
| Win
| align=center| 23–10–2
| Brad Jones
| TKO (punches)
| Pure Action 2
| 
| align=center| 2
| align=center| 1:35
| King's Point, New York, United States
| 
|-
| Loss
| align=center| 22–10–2
| Kazushi Sakuraba
| TKO (retirement)
| Pride Grand Prix 2000 Opening Round
| 
| align=center| 1
| align=center| 15:00
| Tokyo, Japan
| 
|-
| Loss
| align=center| 22–9–2
| Akira Shoji
| Decision (split)
| Pride 6
| 
| align=center| 3
| align=center| 5:00
| Yokohama, Japan
| 
|-
| Loss
| align=center| 22–8–2
| Tito Ortiz
| TKO (punches)
| UFC 19
| 
| align=center| 1
| align=center| 9:56
| Bay St. Louis, Mississippi, United States
| 
|-
| Win
| align=center| 22–7–2
| Yuki Kondo
| Decision (majority)
| Pancrase - Advance 12
| 
| align=center| 1
| align=center| 20:00
| Chiba, Japan
| Defended King of Pancrase Openweight Championship. Later vacated title
|-
| Win
| align=center| 21–7–2
| Ryushi Yanagisawa
| Decision (lost points)
| Pancrase - 1998 Anniversary Show
| 
| align=center| 1
| align=center| 30:00
| Tokyo, Japan
| Defended King of Pancrase Openweight Championship
|-
| Loss
| align=center| 20–7–2
| Semmy Schilt
| TKO (palm strikes)
| Pancrase - Advance 8
| 
| align=center| 1
| align=center| 13:15
| Kobe, Japan
| 
|-
| Win
| align=center| 20–6–2
| Masakatsu Funaki
| Decision (unanimous)
| Pancrase - Advance 5
| 
| align=center| 1
| align=center| 30:00
| Yokohama, Japan
| Won King of Pancrase Openweight Championship
|-
| Win
| align=center| 19–6–2
| Ryushi Yanagisawa
| Decision (unanimous)
| Pancrase - Advance 4
| 
| align=center| 1
| align=center| 20:00
| Tokyo, Japan
| 
|-
| Win
| align=center| 18–6–2
| Johnny Magilonico
| Submission (guillotine choke)
| World Pankration Championships 2
| 
| align=center| 1
| align=center| N/A
| Dallas, Texas, United States
| 
|-
| Win
| align=center| 17–6–2
| Satoshi Hasegawa
| Technical submission (straight armbar)
| Pancrase: Alive 11
| 
| align=center| 1
| align=center| 2:52
| Yokohama, Japan
| 
|-
| Win
| align=center| 16–6–2
| Kiuma Kunioku
| KO (head kick)
| Pancrase: Alive 9
| 
| align=center| 1
| align=center| 11:12
| Tokyo, Japan
| 
|-
| Win
| align=center| 15–6–2
| Paul Lazenby
| Submission (arm-triangle choke)
| World Pankration Championships 1
| 
| align=center| 1
| align=center| N/A
| Texas, United States
| 
|-
| Loss
| align=center| 14–6–2
| Masakatsu Funaki
| Submission (triangle armbar)
| Pancrase: 1997 Anniversary Show
| 
| align=center| 1
| align=center| 3:58
| Chiba, Japan
| 
|-
| Win
| align=center| 14–5–2
| Keiichiro Yamamiya
| Decision (lost points)
| Pancrase: Alive 7
| 
| align=center| 1
| align=center| 15:00
| Fukuoka, Japan
| 
|-
| Win
| align=center| 13–5–2
| Tito Ortiz
| Submission (guillotine choke)
| UFC 13
| 
| align=center| 1
| align=center| 3:00
| Augusta, Georgia, United States
| Won UFC 13 Lightweight Tournament
|-
| Win
| align=center| 12–5–2
| Christophe Leininger
| Decision (unanimous)
| UFC 13
| 
| align=center| 1
| align=center| 15:00
| Augusta, Georgia, United States
| UFC 13 Lightweight Tournament Semifinals
|-
| Loss
| align=center| 11–5–2
| Yuki Kondo
| Decision (lost points)
| Pancrase: Alive 2
| 
| align=center| 1
| align=center| 20:00
| Chiba, Japan
| 
|-
| Win
| align=center| 11–4–2
| Semmy Schilt
| Decision (lost points)
| Pancrase: Alive 1
| 
| align=center| 1
| align=center| 20:00
| Tokyo, Japan
| 
|-
| Win
| align=center| 10–4–2
| Yuki Kondo
| Decision (lost points)
| Pancrase - Truth 10
| 
| align=center| 1
| align=center| 20:00
| Tokyo, Japan
| 
|-
| Loss
| align=center| 9–4–2
| Kiuma Kunioku
| Decision (split)
| Pancrase - Truth 7
| 
| align=center| 1
| align=center| 10:00
| Nagoya, Japan
| 
|-
| Win
| align=center| 9–3–2
| Ryushi Yanagisawa
| Decision (unanimous)
| Pancrase - 1996 Anniversary Show
| 
| align=center| 1
| align=center| 20:00
| Chiba, Japan
| 
|-
|  Draw
| align=center| 8–3–2
| Osami Shibuya
| Draw (majority)
| Pancrase - Truth 6
| 
| align=center| 1
| align=center| 10:00
| Fukuoka, Japan
| 
|-
| Win
| align=center| 8–3–1
| Minoru Suzuki
| KO (slam)
| Pancrase - Truth 5
| 
| align=center| 1
| align=center| 7:59
| Tokyo, Japan
| 
|-
| Win
| align=center| 7–3–1
| Ryushi Yanagisawa
| KO (head kick)
| Pancrase - Truth 4
| 
| align=center| 1
| align=center| 12:21
| Tokyo, Japan
| 1996 Pancrase Ranking Tournament Finals
|-
| Win
| align=center| 6–3–1
| Manabu Yamada
| TKO (doctor stoppage)
| Pancrase - Truth 3
| 
| align=center| 1
| align=center| 6:14
| Tokyo, Japan
| 1996 Pancrase Ranking Tournament Semifinals
|-
| Win
| align=center| 5–3–1
| Takaku Fuke
| Decision (unanimous)
| Pancrase - Truth 3
| 
| align=center| 1
| align=center| 10:00
| Tokyo, Japan
| 1996 Pancrase Ranking Tournament First Round 
|-
| Loss
| align=center| 4–3–1
| Bas Rutten
| Submission (ankle lock)
| Pancrase - Truth 2
| 
| align=center| 1
| align=center| 19:36
| Kobe, Japan
| 
|-
| Win
| align=center| 4–2–1
| Gregory Smit
| Decision (lost points)
| Pancrase - Truth 1
| 
| align=center| 1
| align=center| 10:00
| Yokohama, Japan
| 
|-
| NC
| align=center| 3–2–1
| Minoru Suzuki
| NC (accidental groin kick)
| Pancrase - Eyes Of Beast 7
| 
| align=center| 1
| align=center| 7:15
| Sapporo, Japan
| 
|-
|  Draw
| align=center| 3–1–1
| Ryushi Yanagisawa
| Draw (unanimous)
| Pancrase - Eyes Of Beast 6
| 
| align=center| 1
| align=center| 10:00
| Yokohama, Japan
| 
|-
| Loss
| align=center| 3–1
| Masakatsu Funaki
| Submission (achilles lock)
| Pancrase - 1995 Anniversary Show
| 
| align=center| 1
| align=center| 6:46
| Tokyo, Japan
| 
|-
| Win
| align=center| 3–0
| John Renfroe
| Submission (straight armbar)
| Pancrase - 1995 Neo-Blood Tournament Second Round
| 
| align=center| 1
| align=center| 7:25
| Tokyo, Japan
| 
|-
| Win
| align=center| 2–0
| John Dowdy
| TKO (punches)
| UFC 5
| 
| align=center| 1
| align=center| 2:02
| Charlotte, North Carolina, United States
| UFC 5 Tournament Alternate Bout 
|-
| Win
| align=center| 1–0
| Jason Fairn
| TKO (corner stoppage)
| UFC 4
| 
| align=center| 1
| align=center| 2:13
| Tulsa, Oklahoma, United States
|UFC 4 Tournament Alternate Bout

References

External links
 
 
 
 
 Guy Mezger's Combat Sports
 World Combat League
 
 

1968 births
Living people
American male taekwondo practitioners
American male kickboxers
Kickboxers from Texas
Heavyweight kickboxers
American male judoka
American male mixed martial artists
Mixed martial artists utilizing taekwondo
Mixed martial artists utilizing boxing
Mixed martial artists utilizing wrestling
Mixed martial artists utilizing judo
Mixed martial artists from Texas
Light heavyweight mixed martial artists
Ultimate Fighting Championship male fighters